Marketplace Mall is a one-story and second shopping mall in Winston-Salem on NC 150 (Peters Creek Parkway) in Winston-Salem, North Carolina, United States. Its main anchor stores are Dollar Tree & Hamrick's. 

The mall opened in 1984. Hamrick's was added in 1995. By 2003, the mall had lost the majority of its tenants, but a renovation begun that same year added several new retailers, including a furniture store called Dynasty. Dynasty closed in 2008 and was replaced by a Steve & Barry's clothing store. This store closed the same year and was replaced by a Veterans Affairs clinic in 2010.

References

Shopping malls established in 1984
Shopping malls in North Carolina
Buildings and structures in Winston-Salem, North Carolina
Economy of Winston-Salem, North Carolina